Acrocercops serrigera is a moth of the family Gracillariidae. It is found in Ecuador, the Galápagos Islands and Peru.

References

serrigera
Gracillariidae of South America
Moths described in 1915